Michael F. Thomashow is an American plant biologist currently the University Distinguished Professor, MSU Foundation Professor and an Elected Fellow of the American Association for the Advancement of Science since 2010. His current interests are Arabidopsis genes and biology. His highest cited paper is Plant cold acclimation: freezing tolerance genes and regulatory mechanisms at 2757 times, according to GoogleScholar.

Education
He earned his A.B. at University of California, Los Angeles in 1972 and his Ph.D in 1978.

Publications
Lee CM, Thomashow MF (2012) Photoperiodic regulation of the C-repeat binding factor (CBF) cold acclimation pathway and freezing tolerance in Arabidopsis thaliana. Proc Natl Acad Sci USA 109:15054-15059.
Yang DL, Yao J, Mei CS, Tong XH, Zeng LJ, Li Q, Xiao LT, Sun TP, Li J, Deng XW, Lee CM, Thomashow MF, Yang Y, He Z, He SY (2012) Plant hormone jasmonate prioritizes defense over growth by interfering with gibberellin signaling cascade. Proc Natl Acad Sci USA 109:E1192-200.
Carvallo M, Pino M-T, Jeknic Z, Zou C,  Doherty C, Shiu S-H, Chen THH,  Thomashow MF (2011) A comparison of the low temperature transcriptomes and CBF regulons of three plant species that differ in freezing tolerance—Solanum commersonii, Solanum tuberosum and Arabidopsis thaliana. J Experimental Botany 62: 3807-3819.
Dong MA, Farré EM, Thomashow MF (2011) CIRCADIAN CLOCK-ASSOCIATED and LATE ELONGATED HYPOCOTYL regulate expression of the C-REPEAT BINDING FACTOR (CBF) pathway in Arabidopsis. Proc. Natl. Acad. Sci. USA 108: 7241-7246.
Hu P, Collings C, Chen J, Thomashow M (2011) Global regulation of Arabidopsis genes involved in photosynthesis (Poster), MSU-DOE Plant Research Review. East Lansing, MI 48824, July 21, 2011.

References

Year of birth missing (living people)
Living people
Fellows of the American Association for the Advancement of Science
Michigan State University faculty
21st-century American botanists
University of California, Los Angeles alumni